Rob Holliday (born 1979) is a professional English musician. He has been the live guitarist of rock band Marilyn Manson as well as for Gary Numan, The Prodigy, and Sulpher. He began performing as Marilyn Manson's live bassist in 2007 but switched to guitars in January 2008 due to the return of former bass player Twiggy Ramirez.

Music career
Rob Holliday is half of the band Sulpher, having duties as a lyricist, guitarist, and lead vocalist. The duo have released two albums: Spray, with the singles "One of Us" and "You Ruined Everything", and No One Will Ever Know, which was released in 2018. Sulpher also includes Monti (Curve, Cocteau Twins, Gang of Four, The Jesus and Mary Chain) as producer, programmer, and drummer and Tim Mud as live guitarist. Holliday is currently the live guitarist for Gary Numan and live guitarist and live bassist for The Prodigy, and has also played live guitars and bass for Marilyn Manson during the Rape of the World tour. Holliday did not contribute to the writing or recording of the band's album Eat Me, Drink Me, released in 2007.

Although many people believed Rob to be a temporary member, Manson stated in an interview entitled "Everyone Will Suffer Now" on the Heirophant fansite  that this is not the case, and that Holliday will stay as a permanent member of the band. Holliday played live guitars for The Prodigy on their 2008 tour. It is unclear if he has contributed to Manson's 2009 album The High End of Low, as was the case with the band's former guitarists (with the exception of Mark Chaussee).

Discography

Gary Numan
 Pure (2000)
 Scarred (2003)
 Hybrid (2003)
 Live at Shepherd's Bush Empire (2004)
 Jagged (2006)

Curve
 Gift (2001)

Sulpher
 Spray (2002)
 No One Will Ever Know (2018)

The Mission
 Lighting the Candles (Live CD and DVD) (2005)

The Prodigy
 World's on Fire (Live CD and DVD) (2011)
 The Day Is My Enemy (2015)

Credits
 Low Art Thrill – guitar (1996–1997)
 Curve – live guitar (1998)
 Sulpher – writing, guitar, vocals (1999–present)
 Gary Numan – producer, remixer, live guitar, live bass (2000–2006)
 The Mission – live guitar (2001–2004)
 Flint – live bass (2003)
 The Prodigy – live guitar, live bass (2005–2017)
 Marilyn Manson – live bass (2007), live guitar (2008)

References

Living people
English rock bass guitarists
Marilyn Manson (band) members
The Mission (band) members
Alternative metal bass guitarists
English industrial musicians
1979 births
21st-century English bass guitarists